The Tashkent tramway network formed part of the public transport system in Tashkent, the capital city of Uzbekistan.

History 
The network opened with horsecars in 1901. Since 1912 the system was converted to electric tramway.

Tashkent Mayor Rakhmonbek Usmonov announced on March 29, 2016, that the network would close by year's end in order to make way for more cars and thus aid in reducing congestions within the capital. City-owned operating company Tashgorpastrans also plans to sell the 30  KTM-19 and 20 Vario LF trams, which it acquired in 2007 and 2011, respectively. The system was closed on May 2, 2016.

The plans are to restore the tram system by 2024. This will be done by the French company Alstom.

See also

 Tashkent Metro
 List of town tramway systems in Asia
 Trolleybuses in Tashkent

References

External links

 
 

Tashkent Trams
Transport in Tashkent
Metre gauge railways in Uzbekistan
Tashkent